Guillermo Fernández may refer to:
Guillermo Arriaga Fernández (1926–2014), Mexican dancer, choreographer and composer
Guillermo Falasca Fernandez, Spanish volleyball player
Guillermo Fernández Vara (born 1958), Spanish politician from the Spanish Socialist Workers' Party who served as the President of Extremadura from 2007 to 2011
Guillermo Fernández de Soto (born 1953), Colombian lawyer and diplomat
 (born 1960), Spanish film director
Guillermo Fernández Hierro (born 1993), Spanish footballer
 (born 2013), Argentinian journalist and film director
Guillermo Fernández Romo (born 1978), Spanish football manager
Guillermo Fernández-Shaw (1893–1965), Spanish poet and journalist
Guillermo Matías Fernández (born 1991), Argentine footballer
Guillermo Zorrilla Fernández (born 1963), Mexican politician